The Treaty of Montmartre was signed on 6 February 1662 between Louis XIV and Duke Charles of Lorraine. The treaty was negotiated by Hugues de Lionne. Based on the terms of the accord, Louis XIV was given control of the Duchy of Lorraine.

See also
House of Courtenay
List of treaties

External links
The French Royal Family: Titles and Customs
The French Succession: The Renunciations of 1712, The Treaties of Utrecht and their Aftermath in International Affairs

1662 in France
1662 treaties
Montmartre